Willem Pieter Jacobus Brakman (13 June 19228 May 2008) was a Dutch writer who made his literary debut with the novel Een winterreis in 1961. Brakman received the P. C. Hooft Award in 1980. He was born on 13 June 1922 in The Hague, Netherlands, and died on 8 May 2008 in the same country.

Selected works
1961 – Een winterreis (novel)
1978 – Zes subtiele verhalen
1998 – Ante diluvium (novel)
1998 – De koning is dood (novel)
1999 – Het onlieflijke stadje E.
2004 – De afwijzing (novel)
2006 – Naar de zee, om het strand te zien

Awards
1962: Lucy B. and C.W. van der Hoogt Award (for Een winterreis)
1979: Ferdinand Bordewijk Prijs (for Zes subtiele verhalen)
1980: P. C. Hooft Award

References

1922 births
2008 deaths
20th-century Dutch novelists
20th-century Dutch male writers
21st-century Dutch novelists
Dutch male novelists
Writers from The Hague
Ferdinand Bordewijk Prize winners
P. C. Hooft Award winners
21st-century Dutch male writers